Holzapfel is a surname. Notable people with the surname include:

Beate Holzapfel (born 1966), retired West German high jumper
Brigitte Holzapfel (born 1958), retired West German high jumper
Hartmut Holzapfel (1944–2022), former Hessian Minister of Culture, Chairman of the Hessian Council on Literature
James W. Holzapfel (born 1944), American Republican Party politician, served in the New Jersey General Assembly
Richard N. Holzapfel (born 1954), American professor of Church History and Doctrine at Brigham Young University (BYU)
Riley Holzapfel (born 1988), Canadian professional ice hockey player
Rudi Holzapfel (1938–2005), Irish poet and teacher
Rudolf Maria Holzapfel (1874–1930), Poland-born Austrian psychologist, philosopher

See also
Holzappel